Ernst Kretschmer (born 3 July 1951) is a linguistics professor at the University of Modena and Reggio Emilia, and the 1990 winner of the Kassel Literary Prize.

References

External links
Official Site at the University of Modena

Living people
1951 births
Linguists from Germany